Hoti (pronounced Ootay) is a union council in the Mardan District of Khyber Pakhtunkhwa. The town is located at 34°12'0N°, 72°4'0E at an altitude of 284 metres (935 feet) and lies just east of Peshawar, the capital of the province, and is inhabited by the Kamalzai Pashtuns, a sub-tribe of the Mandanr.

The people of this area only speak Pukhto, and the adhere strongly to the Pukhtoon traditions of hospitality and loyalty.

Although the MPs are democratically elected in Khyber-Pakhtunkhwa, the old feudal system is still strong in Hoti. The head of the leading feudal family is Mohammad Ali Khan Hoti, a former education minister of Pakistan.

Notable people
Sher Ali Bacha (1935-1998), Pashtun nationalist politician
Ibrahim Peshawari (1850-1930), Islamic scholar in Bengal

References

Union councils of Mardan District